Salagena tessellata is a moth in the family Cossidae. It is found in Kenya, South Africa and Tanzania.

References

Natural History Museum Lepidoptera generic names catalog

Metarbelinae
Moths described in 1897